Niurka Marcos Calle is a Cuban-Mexican singer, dancer, actress, and vedette.

Personal life
Marcos was born in Havana, Cuba to Carmelo Marcos, a Cuban navy major, and Salustiana "Celeste" Calle, a housewife. She has five siblings: Martha, Maribel, Thomas, María del Carmen, and Ernesto. In 2003 Marcos dated actor Bobby Larios. They subsequently married, but that marriage ended in divorce. Marcos was then married to Yanixán Texido in 2007. The couple separated in May 2009 and on February 6, 2011, they divorced.

She was part of the first group of foreigners naturalized by President Vicente Fox, and has three Mexican-born children: Itzcoatl "Kiko", Romina, and Emilio.

In 2018, Marcos stated in an interview that her mother had died.

Career
Marcos starred in the telenovela Velo de Novia, produced by her then-boyfriend Juan Osorio. In 2001, Marcos portrayed an erotic dancer named Karicia in the Mexican soap opera Salomé   starring Edith González and Guy Ecker, for which she earned a TVyNovelas Award for Best Supporting Actress at the 20th TVyNovelas Awards. In 2004, she was a contestant on the reality series Big Brother México. She appeared as a supporting actress on La Fea Más Bella during 2006 and sang on its soundtrack album on the track "Se Busca Un Hombre." In 2007, she released an album titled La Emperadora and posed for the February 2007 issue of the Mexican edition of Playboy magazine.

She started her own show in 2008 called Espectacularmente Niurka. She also hosts El Show De Niurka which features games, dancing, singing and a jacuzzi in which she interviews other artists. Marcos was cast for a theatrical remake of La ronda de las arpías in August 2009. In 2011, Marcos joined the cast of Emperatriz as the new villain.

Discography
 Alcatraz Es... Dulce (1999)
 Latin Pop (2001)
 La Emperadora (2007)
 Niurka Marcos (2021)

Filmography

Television

Other
2007: "Que Lloren" (Music video by Ivy Queen)

References

External links

 

Living people
Cuban female dancers
Cuban women singers
Cuban television actresses
Cuban television presenters
Cuban women television presenters
Cuban vedettes
Mexican vedettes
Mexican female dancers
Mexican women singers
Mexican television presenters
Mexican women television presenters
Cuban emigrants to Mexico
Mexican telenovela actresses
Naturalized citizens of Mexico
People from Havana
Cuban Santeríans
Mexican Santeríans
Mexican LGBT rights activists
Cuban LGBT rights activists
Year of birth missing (living people)